Migmocera flavicauda is a species of longhorn beetles belonging to the family Cerambycidae, the only species in the genus Migmocera.

The beetle larvae in this specie usually drills into wood and can cause damage to living wood trunks or felled wood.

References

Piezocerini
Monotypic beetle genera